X-Tigi Mobile is a Hong Kong-based smartphone manufacturer that was founded in 2006, the company has research & development center and factory located in China. X-Tigi service network is available in most African countries (especially Kenya and Ghana) since it entered the African market in 2009.

X-Tigi mobile phones were known for power-bank phones that could last weeks in Africa. In 2017,  the company launched its first 4G LTE smartphone—Inspire 3, that supports fingerprint reader at the back in Africa.

In 2017, X-Tigi is now in partnership with over 10,000 retailers in Africa (especially Kilimall, Jumia), competing with the share value of Samsung and Tecno, Infinix.

X-Tigi Kenya 

X-Tigi started business in Kenya since 2009, meanwhile some new flagship smartphones with specification of 64GB ROM plus 4GB RAM such as X-Tigi A1 plus were launched, which made X-Tigi brand compete with the share value of Samsung and Tecno, Infinix in Kenya.

In 2016, X-Tigi started cooperation with Jumia Kenya, which made X-Tigi goods reachable online in Kenya.

X-Tigi Ghana 
X-Tigi entered into Ghana  in 2007, then its rapid expanding makes X-Tigi Ghana one of the famous mobile brands in Ghana.

X-Tigi Offices have been established in at least 3 cities up to 2017 in Ghana.

X-Tigi Cote d'ivoire 
X-Tigi started business in Cote d'ivoire since 2010, and X-Tigi brand became in partnership with Jumia Cote d'ivoire In 2016,  which makes X-Tigi goods both available online and offline in Cote d'ivoire market.

X-Tigi Tanzania 
X-Tigi first showed its brand in Tanzania in 2016, and then grow fast with offices established in main cities such as Dar es salaam, Mwanza, Arusha, etc.

X-Tigi in other African countries 
In the past ten years, X-Tigi Mobile has set its brand shown in many other African countries, namely, Mali, Burkina Faso, Gabon, Guinea, Togo, Senegal, Cameroon, Benin, Rwanda and so on, with more than 30 million handsets sold.

References

External links
X-Tigi A1 Plus First Impressions – Performance Specs at a Budget
5 Things to Love About the All New X-TIGI A1 Plus
"Jumia by the Numbers: Smartphones Account for 45% of All Items Sold on Jumia, Infinix Top Brand in 2015",Jumia, Kenya. Retrieved 2016-05-25
 "Meet the X-Tigi Inspire 3"techweez.com. Retrieved 2017-02-16.
 "How to watch 3D movies on the X- TIGI Vision6",Tuko News,Kenya. Retrieved 2016-10-16.
 "X-TIGI Vision 6 Review; Virtual Reality Experience at a Budget",androidafrica.co.ke. Retrieved 2016-09-14.
 "XTIGI S1550 Smartphone Launches Online in Kenya",www.kenyabuzz.com. Retrieved 2015-10-21.

Mobile phone companies of Hong Kong
Chinese companies established in 2005
Hong Kong brands
Electronics companies established in 2005
2005 establishments in Hong Kong